ASMF may refer to:

 Academy of St Martin in the Fields
 Active Substance Master File
 Asia Ski Mountaineering Federation